The European Union Border Assistance Mission to Moldova and Ukraine (EUBAM Moldova and Ukraine) was launched in 2005. It promotes border control, customs, and trade norms and practices that meet European Union standards and serve the needs of its two partner countries. It is an advisory, technical body based in Odesa, Ukraine. It has a Liaison Office in Chișinău, Moldova, and six field offices; three on the Moldovan side of the joint border and three on the Ukrainian side. EUBAM activities are intended to promote economic development and enhance regional security. The Mission contributes to cross-border cooperation and confidence building, helping to improve efficiency, transparency, and security along the Moldova–Ukraine border.

Aims
The Mission's aims are to:
 work with Moldova and Ukraine to harmonize border control, customs, and trade standards and procedures with those EU Member States
 improve cross-border cooperation between the border guard and customs agencies and other law enforcement bodies; facilitate international coordinated cooperation
 assist Moldova and Ukraine to fulfil the obligations of the Deep and Comprehensive Free Trade Area (DCFTA) they have signed as part of their Association Agreements with the EU
 contribute to the peaceful settlement of the Transnistria conflict through confidence-building measures and a monitoring presence at the Transnistrian segment of the Moldova-Ukraine border

References

External links

Border assistance missions of the European Union
Transnistria conflict
Moldova–Ukraine relations
Moldova–European Union relations
Ukraine–European Union relations